Dimari is a settlement in the municipality Georgios Karaiskakis, in the regional unit of Arta, Greece.

Populated places in Arta (regional unit)